Mimophisma is a genus of moths in the family Erebidae. The genus was erected by George Hampson in 1926.

Species
Mimophisma albifimbria Hampson, 1926
Mimophisma delunaris (Guenee, 1852)
Mimophisma forbesi Schaus, 1940

References

Poaphilini
Moth genera